Amnicola cora is a species of very small freshwater snail which has an operculum, an aquatic prosobranch gastropod mollusk in the family Amnicolidae according to the taxonomy of the Gastropoda (Bouchet & Rocroi, 2005).

This species is endemic to the United States. Its natural habitat is rivers. It is threatened by habitat loss.

References

Amnicola
Gastropods described in 1979
Taxonomy articles created by Polbot